4-Methoxycinnamaldehyde is a bioactive isolate of Agastache rugosa.

References

Phytochemicals
Aldehydes
Phenylpropanoids